Halifax County Courthouse may refer to:

 Halifax County Courthouse (North Carolina), Halifax, North Carolina
 Halifax County Courthouse (Virginia), Halifax, Virginia